Guns & Talks is a 2001 South Korean film written and directed by Jang Jin. Starring Shin Hyun-joon, Won Bin, Shin Ha-kyun, Jung Jae-young and Jung Jin-young, the black comedy is about a group of four assassins-for-hire, with a dogged prosecutor on their trail.

Plot
In the middle of downtown Seoul, mysterious bombings and murders are taking place. Four men leave a crime scene, skillfully evading the police. This eccentric band of killers consists of team leader Sang-yeon (Shin Hyun-joon), bomb specialist Jung-woo (Shin Ha-kyun), sniper Jae-young (Jung Jae-young), and computer hacker Ha-yoon (Won Bin). These hitmen believe they're doing a vital job in society, just like any other profession. They run a private business where people from all walks of life come to them and place an order. After they meet their clients and discuss the time, place and method by which they want their targets to be eliminated, they sign a formal contract. They even have a discount rate for students. When the deal is done, they carry out their mission and finish it like a typical day at work. The four live and work together in mundane harmony, eating Ha-yoon's bad cooking and watching their crush (Go Eun-mi) read the news on TV. One day, a persistent high school girl (Gong Hyo-jin) shows up at their door and keeps trying to hire them, while Jung-woo falls for his target, a pregnant woman (Oh Seung-hyun). Then Sang-yeon gets approached for a big job he can't turn down, one far riskier than what they're used to. The client wants someone killed in the middle of a sold-out Hamlet play with high-profile businessmen, politicians and law officers in attendance. Meanwhile, the determined and intelligent prosecutor Jo (Jung Jin-young) is on to them, and mobilizes the police force to catch them in the act.

Cast

 Shin Hyun-joon as Sang-yeon
 Won Bin as Ha-yoon
 Shin Ha-kyun as Jung-woo
 Jung Jae-young as Jae-young
 Jung Jin-young as Prosecutor Jo
 Oh Seung-hyun as Hwa-yi
 Gong Hyo-jin as Yeo-il
 Go Eun-mi as Oh Young-ran 
 Jung Gyu-soo as Detective Kim
 Kim Hak-chul as Chief Choi 
 Yoon Joo-sang as Mr. Ju
 Son Hyun-joo as Tak Mun-bae
 Jo Deok-hyun as thug
 Min Yoon-jung as Detective Jin
 Im Seung-dae as Hwa-yi's lover
 Lee Ha-ra as secretary of Hwa-yi's lover
 Kim Ji-young as grandmother
 Kim Il-woong as man in Mercedes Benz
 Ryoo Seung-bum as motorcyclist
 Im Won-hee as priest
 Song Geum-sik as man 1
 Kim Young-woong as man 2
 Heo Ki-ho as man 3
 Yang Dong-jae as man 4
 Park Kyung-won as agent 1
 Kim Joon-seok as agent 2
 Kim Young-hoon as agent 3
 Park Jin-taek as agent 4
 Seon Hak as agent 5
 Kim Min-kyo as soldier 2

Reception
The film was released in South Korea on 12 October 2001 and topped the box office for three weeks. It was the No. 7 best selling domestic movie in South Korea in 2001 with 2,227,000 admissions.

References

External links

2001 films
2000s Korean-language films
South Korean action comedy films
Films directed by Jang Jin
2000s South Korean films